Ibrahim Hakkı Erzurumi (18 May 1703 – 22 June 1780), a popular sufi saint of Turkey from Erzurum in eastern Anatolia - mystic, poet, author, astronomer, physicist, psychologist, sociologist and Hanafi Maturidi Islamic scholar. He was a Turkish Sufi philosopher and encyclopedist.

Life and Works

Having lost his mother and later his father at an early age, Ibrahim Hakkı was raised by his uncle who educated him for a while. He met the Ottoman Sultan Mahmut I at istanbul in 1747. He returned to Erzurum, and was continuously interested in religious and scientific matters. Having written 15 books in the “manzum” and regular styles and a great number in Turkish, Arabic, and Persian, amongst Ibrahim Hakkı's most important works are the Divan and Marifetname.

In 1756 he published Marifetname (Book of Gnosis), a compilation and commentary on astronomy, mathematics, anatomy, psychology, philosophy, and Islamic mysticism. It is famous for containing the first treatment of post-Copernican astronomy by a Muslim scholar ('ālim).Marifetname contains tasawwuf knowledge along with a wide range of general scientific and encyclopedic knowledge. Completed in 1757, the book was written in the language of the layman. According to the author, it was compiled from 400 books. It is a first in the explanation of observational astronomy of the solar system by a scholar in a book. An English translation was published in 2010.

He died and was buried in Tillo of Siirt Province.

Theology
Core to Erzurumi's philosophy is that self-examination is absolutely necessary as part of the process of the discovery of God: "Allah has revealed in His Divine Books, and has sent His prophets as guides to help lead us back to heedfulness. Only those who are able to wake up and rediscover that which is holy within themselves, can come close to our Creator, which is perfection."

He is widely quoted for saying, "If we take one step towards Allah, He will come running to meet us," which is derived from a hadith qudsi.

References

External links
İbrahim Hakkı Erzurumi (in Turkish)

 https://plus.google.com/collection/YNLbsB

Encyclopedists from the Ottoman Empire
Scientists from the Ottoman Empire
Philosophers from the Ottoman Empire
Astronomers from the Ottoman Empire
Ottoman Sufis
Sufi saints from the Ottoman Empire
Islamic mysticism
Islamic philosophers
1703 births
1780 deaths
18th-century astronomers
18th-century scientists
Hanafis
Maturidis